Aminoacyl tRNA synthetase complex-interacting multifunctional protein 2 is an enzyme that in humans is encoded by the AIMP2 gene.

Function 

The JTV1 gene is located on chromosome 7p22 flanked by two genes, HRI and PMS2. JTV1 and HRI overlap slightly and are arranged in a tail-to-tail fashion. JTV1 and PMS2 are separated by approximately 200 base pairs and are arranged head-to-head. JTV1 is transcribed in the opposite direction compared to HRI and PMS2. The function of the JTV1 gene product is unknown.

Interactions 

Multisynthetase complex auxiliary component p38 has been shown to interact with Parkin (ligase), P53 and KARS.

References

Further reading 

 
 
 
 
 
 
 
 
 
 

Human proteins